The Qualification Review Committee of the 20th National Congress of the Chinese Communist Party was elected by congress delegates in a preparatory meeting before the convening of the congress. 

Zhao Leji, the sitting Secretary of the Central Commission for Discipline Inspection, was elected Chairman of the Qualification Review Committee while Chen Xi and Miao Hua were elected as deputy chairs.

Members

See also
 20th National Congress of the Chinese Communist Party
 Organization of the Chinese Communist Party

References

20th National Congress of the Chinese Communist Party